Canim Falls is a 23 metre high waterfall on the Canim River between Canim Lake and Mahood Lake in Wells Gray Provincial Park in the Cariboo region of the Central Interior of British Columbia, Canada.

A trail from Mahood Lake Road leads to Canim Falls and nearby Mahood Falls.

"Canim" means a type of large canoe in the Chinook Jargon.

See also
Wells Gray-Clearwater volcanic field

References

Waterfalls of British Columbia
Landforms of the Cariboo
Chinook Jargon place names
Wells Gray-Clearwater